Giuseppe Fanelli (13 October 1827 – 5 January 1877) was an Italian revolutionary anarchist, best known for his tour of Spain 1868, introducing the anarchist ideas of Mikhail Bakunin.

Life and revolutionary path 
Fanelli was born in Naples, Italy on 13 October 1827. At the age of 18, he enrolled in Giovine Italia, a political movement with the goal to create a united Italian republic.

He was active in the insurrectionary, united Italian republic Young Italy movement and fought in the Milan insurrection of the 1848 revolution. He went on to fight alongside Garibaldi's Redshirts in the Expedition of the Thousand in Sicily in 1860; he also fought in the Polish uprising in 1863. He was elected to Italian Parliament in November 1865 and fought against the Austrians in 1866.

Fanelli met Bakunin at Ischia in 1866. In October 1868 Bakunin sponsored Fanelli to travel to Barcelona to share his libertarian visions and recruit revolutionists to the International Workingmen's Association. Fanellis trip and the meeting he organised during his travels provided the catalyst for the Spanish exiles, the largest workers' and peasants' movement in modern Spain and the largest anarchist movement in modern Europe.

Fanelli's tour took him first to Barcelona, where he met and stayed with Élisée Reclus. Reclus and Fanelli were at odds over Reclus' friendships with Spanish republicans, and Fanelli soon left Barcelona for Madrid. Fanelli stayed in Madrid until the end of January 1869, conducting meetings to introduce Spanish workers, including Anselmo Lorenzo, to the First National. In February 1869 Fanelli left Madrid, journeying home via Barcelona. While in Barcelona again, he met with painter Josep Lluís Pellicer and his cousin, Rafael Farga Pellicer along with others who were to play an important role establishing the International in Barcelona.

Death 
Fanelli died of tuberculosis in Naples in 1877.

Perceptions of others in regard to Fanelli

References

References and further reading

See also 
 Anarchism in Spain

1827 births
1877 deaths
Collectivist anarchists
Italian anarchists
Italian revolutionaries
Members of the International Workingmen's Association
19th-century Neapolitan people
19th-century deaths from tuberculosis
Tuberculosis deaths in Italy
Infectious disease deaths in Campania